The Dean of Worcester is the head of the Chapter of Worcester Cathedral in Worcester, England. The current dean is Peter Atkinson, who lives at The Deanery, College Green,  Worcester.

List of deans

Early modern
1541–1544 Henry Holbeach (last prior)
1544–1553 John Barlow
1553–1557 Philip Hawford
1557–1559 Seth Holland
1559–1571 John Pedder 
1571–1586 Thomas Wilson
1586–1597 Francis Willis
1597–1604 Richard Edes
1604–1608 James Montague
1608–1616 Arthur Lake
1616–1627 Joseph Hall
1627–1633 William Juxon
1633–1636 Roger Maynwaring
1636–1646 Christopher Potter
1646–1649 Richard Holdsworth
1649–1660 No dean during the Interregnum
1660–1661 John Oliver
1661–1665 Thomas Warmestry
1665–1683 William Thomas
1683–1691 George Hickes
1691–1715 William Talbot
1715–1726 Francis Hare
1726–1746 James Stillingfleet
1746–1751 Edmund Marten

1751–1765 John Waugh
1765–1769 Richard Wrottesley
1769–1778 William Digby
1778–1783 Robert Foley
1783–1795 St Andrew St John (son of Lord St John of Bletso)

Late modern
1795–1817 Arthur Onslow
1817–1825 John Jenkinson
1825–1828 James Hook
1828–1845 George Murray, Bishop of Rochester
1845–1874 John Peel
1874–1879 Hon Grantham Yorke
1879–1886 Lord Alwyne Compton
1886–1891 John Gott
1891–1908 Robert Forrest
1908–1934 William Moore Ede
1934–1949 Arthur Davies
1949–1957 William Beck
1957–1968 Bobby Milburn
1969–1974 Eric Kemp
1975–1986 Tom Baker
1987–1996 Bob Jeffery
1996–2006 Peter Marshall
2006–present Peter Atkinson

References

Sources
B. Green, Bishops and Deans of Worcester (Worcester 1979).

 
Christianity in Worcester, England
Anglican Diocese of Worcester
Dean of Worcester